Čelevec is a small village in the western part of the Demir Kapija Municipality of North Macedonia. It mostly consists of Turkish inhabitants. The people are very traditional and the village is located in a wooded area between mountains. To get there, walk along the river at the stop between the two tunnels on the main highway to Gevgelija leading into the canyon. Alpinists train along this path; the canyon is visible from the top of the rocks.

Additionally, the village has a road from the village Korešnica.

Demographics
As of the 2021 census, Čelevec had 43 residents with the following ethnic composition:
Turks: 38
Persons for whom data are taken from administrative sources: 4
Albanians: 1

According to the 2002 census, the village had a total of 52 inhabitants. Ethnic groups in the village include:
Turks: 52

References

Notes 
 Demir Kapija: From Prehistory to Today , p 96

Villages in Demir Kapija Municipality
Turkish communities in North Macedonia